Steven Ralph Arrington (born March 5, 1956) is an American singer, songwriter, drummer, record producer, engineer and minister, who grew up in Dayton, Ohio.

Biography
Arrington played in various local bands before joining and touring with The Murphys, a lounge band out of Toledo, Ohio, in 1975. About a year later Arrington relocated from Ohio to San Francisco, California where he learned Latin percussion and drumming as well as playing with Coke Escovedo, Pete Escovedo and Sheila E.

He joined the funk group Slave (founded 1975) on their third LP, called The Concept, in 1978 – originally to play percussion, then later becoming the drummer and a backing vocalist. Eventually Arrington took over lead vocals, singing on the hit singles "Just a Touch of Love", "Watching You" (which has been sampled by Snoop Dogg) and "Wait for Me".

Arrington left Slave in 1982, forming Steve Arrington's Hall of Fame, and had hit singles such as "Weak at the Knees" (which was sampled by Three Times Dope, Jay-Z, Jermaine Dupri, Ice Cube, and others), and "Nobody Can Be You But You".

His most successful album was his 1985 solo work Dancin' in the Key of Life, whose title track became a top ten R&B hit. The single also spent three weeks at number two on the dance charts, and went to number three on the Radio & Records R&B airplay chart. Another single from the album, "Feel So Real" reached #5 in the UK Singles Chart in May that year. He was nominated for the NAACP Image Award for Best Male Artist of 1986.

In 1984 Arrington experienced a religious conversion, later becoming a licensed minister and, in 1990, he left pop music until his re-emergence in October 2009, when he released the R&B, Funk, spiritual album Pure Thang.

In September 2010 Stones Throw Records announced that Arrington was working with producer Dâm-Funk on a new album. In February, Arrington did an interview with The Revivalist and told them his new album, "Love, Peace and Funky Beatz", was due out in late summer or early fall 2011.

On August 6, 2013, Stones Throw Records released Arrington + Dam-Funk's "Higher".

In September 2014 Tummy Touch released the album "Way Out (80–84)", a collection of songs from Hall of Fame Vol 1 and Positive Power, plus unreleased and previously unfinished material.

On September 18, 2020, Stones Throw Records released a new solo album by Steve Arrington titled Down to the Lowest Terms: The Soul Sessions with the single "Keep Dreamin'". The album recording took place in 2019–2020 in collaboration with a cast of a new generation of talented producers orchestrated with the help of Stones Throw founder Peanut Butter Wolf. Producers include DJ Harrison, Knxwledge, J Rocc, Shibo, Jerry Paper, Brian Ellis, Gifted & Blessed, and Benedek.

Discography

Albums with Steve Arrington's Hall of Fame

Solo albums

Singles with Steve Arrington's Hall of Fame

Solo singles

Compilation albums

References

External links
 Steve Arrington's official website
 Steve Arrington @ Discogs
 Steve Arrington's Hall Of Fame @ Discogs
 Steve Arrington 2014 Interview on Soulinterviews.com
 Steve Arrington 2012 @ Red Bull Music Academy
 Steve Arrington's artist page on Stones Throw Records
 Pitchfork 2020 Album Review of Down to the Lowest Terms: The Soul Sessions

1956 births
Living people
African-American drummers
African-American record producers
Record producers from Ohio
African-American male singer-songwriters
American dance musicians
American contemporary R&B singers
American Protestant religious leaders
Singer-songwriters from Ohio
Musicians from Dayton, Ohio
American funk singers
American session musicians
Atlantic Records artists
Atco Records artists
20th-century American drummers
American male drummers
20th-century African-American male singers
21st-century African-American male singers